Thomas Daniel Mottola (born July 14, 1948) is an American record executive. Mottola is currently the Chairman of Mottola Media Group and was previously the Chairman and CEO of Sony Music Entertainment, parent of the Columbia label, for nearly 15 years. Since 2000, he has been married to Mexican actress and singer Thalía.

Early life
Mottola was born in The Bronx to a middle-class Italian-American family. He graduated from Iona Grammar School in 1962 and Iona Prep in 1966. He attended military school for a time, and then high school. After dropping out of Hofstra University on Long Island, he pursued a music career as a guitarist and singer with The Exotics, an R&B cover band.

Mottola entered in the music scene in the mid-1960s as a recording artist for CBS Records, under the name "T.D. Valentine". After his attempt to become a recording star himself failed, Mottola started working for publishing powerhouse Chappell Publishing and started his own management company, Champion Entertainment Organization. His role at Chappell put him in touch with many artists, and soon he signed his first successful management clients, Daryl Hall & John Oates. Mottola helped Hall and Oates land a record deal and several high-profile endorsements.

Mottola was also recognized  for managing the black rock group Xavion successfully using new media for promotion, such as music videos and corporate sponsorship for music tours.

Sony/Columbia
In 1988, Mottola was hired by Sony Music (then known as CBS Records) by Walter Yetnikoff to run its U.S. operations. In 1990, he replaced Yetnikoff as Chairman CEO of the newly named Sony Music. During his tenure, he transformed Sony into one of the most successful global music companies, expanding its businesses into over 60 countries, while creating one of the strongest management teams in the music industry. He revitalized Sony Music's publishing division by making such acquisitions as the Beatles catalog and enabled Sony to become the first major music company to make commercial digital downloads available. During his 15-year career, Mottola built Sony up from a company with revenues of $800 million a year to one with over $6 billion of annual revenue by 2000.

He is widely well known for signing Celine Dion, Mariah Carey, Gloria Estefan, Destiny's Child, Jessica Simpson, Anastacia, Shakira, the Dixie Chicks, as well as for releasing digitally remastered compact discs of older recordings made by Barbra Streisand, Bruce Springsteen, Billy Joel, Andy Williams, Pink Floyd among others. In the late 1990s, Mottola contributed to the popularity of such Sony artists as Ricky Martin, Jennifer Lopez and Marc Anthony.

He also worked with Michael Jackson from the time he began recording his Dangerous album. During the promotion of Jackson's album Invincible in 2001, Jackson later stated that his relationship with Mottola dissolved based on corruption in Mottola's working practices, and accused him of being a "racist who exploited black talent". Jackson stated later on that "The recording companies really, really do conspire against the artists." Later, Jackson, who an advisor said could be paranoid, reportedly kept an “enemy list” on which Mottola appeared, along with Rabbi Shmuley Boteach, illusionist Uri Geller, attorney Gloria Allred, DA Tom Sneddon, and Janet Arvizo, mother of a Jackson accuser. Al Sharpton told the New York Post shortly after that, "I have known Tommy for 15 or 20 years, and never once have I known him to say or do anything that would be considered racist". He admitted he was "taken aback and surprised" by Jackson's remarks. "In fact, he's always been supportive of the black music industry," Sharpton said. "He was the first record executive to step up and offer to help us with respect to corporate accountability, when it comes to black music issues."

After Sony
Mottola was the head of Sony Music Entertainment until January 2003. Since leaving his post as chief of Sony Music, Mottola has been building a new entertainment company, complete with recorded music, television production, theater, and fashion, alongside a branding and management company that had recently launched. He was instrumental in re-launching the various careers of such artists as Marc Anthony and Lindsay Lohan. Later signings included Cassie Ventura and Mika.

Mottola bought out the rights to Casablanca Records (a then-diminished imprint of Polygram), and resurrected it, signing Lohan and Mika.

Mottola published a book titled Hitmaker in January 2013, written alongside Cal Fussman. He details his successes and the drive that propelled him to the top of the business, but also talks at length about the downtimes.

Mottola produced the recent musical adaptation of Chazz Palminteri's A Bronx Tale. Palminteri credits Mottola with the realization of the new project, developed over the past two years. Mottola brought the idea for A Bronx Tale musical to producer group Dodger Properties and "put the musical on his back". The show started previews at Paper Mill Playhouse on February 4, 2016, opened on February 14, 2016, and closed on March 6, 2016. The show officially opened on Broadway in December 2016 and after 29 previews and over 700 regular performances closed on August 5, 2018. A national tour will begin in October opening in Los Angeles at the Pantages Theatre.

In 2018, Mottola's Mottola Media signed a multi year first look deal with eOne to develop scripted and unscripted TV.

NTERTAIN 
In March, 2021, Mottola, along with Neon16 CEO and Co-founder Lex Borrero and representation firm Range Media Partners formed NTERTAIN – an entertainment and media company that creates, develops and produces content across multiple mediums, highlighting Latino stories and representing Latino talent, brands and culture.

The idea for NTERTAIN came about when Borrero, Mottola and Iván Rodríguez, NEON16's Head of Creative, determined there wasn't enough quality content that truly represented the culture and Latin experience in the United States and globally.

NTERTAIN is based in Miami with Mottola and Borrero heading the company in partnership with Peter Micelli, CEO of Range Media Partners.

Personal life
Mottola has been married three times. He converted to Judaism to marry his first wife, Lisa Clark, daughter of ABC Records head Sam Clark, in 1971. The couple divorced in 1990, after having two children.

On June 5, 1993, Mottola married his second wife, Mariah Carey. They announced their separation on May 30, 1997, and later divorced on March 5, 1998.  
He married his third wife, Thalía,  on December 2, 2000, at New York City's St. Patrick's Cathedral. Their daughter was born in October 2007, and their son was born in June 2011.

In popular culture
Hall and Oates' song "Gino (The Manager)", from the duo's album Daryl Hall & John Oates (1975), was written about Mottola.  The record jacket insert reads: "And introducing Tommy Mottola as 'Little Gino'".
In the 1976 song "Cherchez La Femme" by Dr. Buzzard's Original Savannah Band, Mottola is namechecked at the start of the song.
The character of Gene Balboa, in the Channel 101 Internet TV series Yacht Rock, is loosely based on Mottola, in particular his time as Hall and Oates' manager.
Mariah Carey wrote a song called "Petals" on her album Rainbow (1999), which addresses her marriage to Mottola. In the song, Carey refers to Mottola as "Valentine"— alluding to his former stage name, T.D. Valentine. She later addressed her marriage to Mottola in detail in her 2020 memoir The Meaning of Mariah Carey.
In the television series Wu-Tang: An American Saga, Mottola is portrayed by Ryan O'Nan

Bibliography
 Mottola, Tommy with Cal Fussman, Hitmaker: The Man and His Music (New York: Grand Central Publishing, 2013) . 
 Tosches, Nick, Dangerous Dances: The Authorized Biography (New York: St. Martin's Press, 1984) .

Notes

References

External links

1948 births
Living people
American music managers
American music industry executives
American people of Italian descent
A&R people
Businesspeople from New York City
Casablanca Records
Celine Dion
Mariah Carey
People from the Bronx
Iona Preparatory School alumni